Pitelinsky District is an administrative and municipal district (raion), one of the twenty-five in Ryazan Oblast, Russia. It is located in the northeast of the oblast. Its administrative center is the urban locality (a work settlement) of Pitelino. Population: 5,893 (2010 Census);  The population of Pitelino accounts for 38.3% of the district's total population.

Notable residents 

Aleksei Mamykin (1936–2011), football player and coach, born in Veryaevo

References

Notes

Sources

Districts of Ryazan Oblast